Jaime Ostos Carmona (8 April 1931 – 8 January 2022) was a Spanish bullfighter.

Biography
Ostos made his debut in Écija on 1 June 1952 alongside Bartolomé Jiménez Torres. His debut with picadors took place in Osuna on 5 April 1953 again with Torres. His bullfighting debut came on 13 October 1956 in the Plaza de Toros de Zaragoza alongside his godfather, Miguel Báez Espuny. He was awarded the Trophea Manolete in 1959. 

He was gored by a bull while participating in a fight in Tarazona on 17 July 1963 and presumed dead. However, thanks to a blood transfusion of ten liters, he was saved. In 1974 he announced his full-time retirement, and participated in his last event in 2003.

In March 2020, he was admitted to the Hospital de la Zarzuela in Madrid for being infected with COVID-19 during the beginning of the pandemic in Spain, and was discharged two months later. Ostos died of a heart attack in Bogotá on 8 January 2022, at the age of 90. He was visiting the country with his wife and a group of friends.

References

1931 births
2022 deaths
People from Écija
Sportspeople from the Province of Seville
Spanish bullfighters